Lionheart is a 1968 children's adventure film directed by Michael Forlong.
The film is based on the novel Lionheart written by Alexander Fullerton in 1965.

Synopsis
A young boy rescues and protects an escaped circus lion.

Cast

Production
Sponsored by the Children's Film Foundation.
The film was classified as "universal" suitable for audiences aged four years and over.

References

External links
 

1968 films
1960s British films
1960s English-language films
British children's adventure films
Children's Film Foundation
Films directed by Michael Forlong